Gozuiyeh or Gazuiyeh or Gazooeyeh or Gazuyeh may refer to:
 Gazuiyeh, Bardsir
 Gazuiyeh, Shahr-e Babak
 Gazuiyeh, Zarand
 Gazuiyeh Cheshmeh Khandali
 Gozuiyeh-ye Olya
 Gozuiyeh-ye Sofla